Etazepine (INN) is an anticonvulsant with a tricyclic structure which is related to the benzodiazepines, but was never marketed. It appears to exert its effects via acting through the GABAergic system.

See also 
 Benzodiazepine

References 

Anticonvulsants
Dibenzazepines
Lactams
GABAA receptor positive allosteric modulators
Abandoned drugs